Sandy Stewart may refer to:

 Sandy Stewart (singer) (born 1937), jazz singer, mother of pianist Bill Charlap
 Sandy Stewart (musician) (born 1958), singer from Texas
 Sandy Stewart (producer) (1930–1998), Canadian television producer and writer
 Sandy Stewart (footballer) (born 1965), Scottish footballer and football manager
 Sandy Stewart (coach), American volleyball coach

See also
Alexander Stewart (disambiguation) 
Stewart (name)